Uig is a hamlet  south west of Uig in Snizort, on the eastern shore of Loch Dunvegan, in the civil parish of Duirinish, on the Isle of Skye, in the council area of Highland, Scotland.

History 
The name "Uig" came from Old Norse vík ("bay").

References 

Populated places in the Isle of Skye